Shanghai Shenhua F.C. is a Chinese professional football club that participates in the Chinese Super League under license from the Chinese Football Association (CFA). The term shen hua literally translates as "the Flower of Shanghai" in English – shen is one of the alternative names of Shanghai and hua means flower in Chinese. The team is based in Kangqiao, Shanghai and their home stadium is the Hongkou Football Stadium, which has a seating capacity of 33,060. Their majority shareholder is Chinese holding company Shanghai Jiushi Group.

The club's predecessor was the municipal-run semi-pro club Shanghai F.C.. The team predominantly played in the top tier, where they won several domestic league and cup titles. On 10 December 1993 the club was reorganized to become a completely professional football club so they could play in the 1994 Chinese Jia-A League season making them one of the founding members of the first fully professional top-tier league in China. Since then, they have won one league title and three Chinese FA Cups.

According to Forbes, Shenhua are the 6th most valuable football team in China, with a team value of $106 million, and an estimated revenue of $29 million in 2015.

History

Early club
Shanghai Shenhua's predecessor was originally called East China, a team name used as far back as 1910 for the football in the multi-sport event Chinese National Games. The local Shanghai government sports body decided to use this name for their new club founded on 1 November 1951 to take part in China's first fully nationalized national football league tournament where they finished second in the league that year. The football league gradually expanded and the team were allowed to name themselves after their own province of Shanghai in 1957. Soon afterwards by 1961, Shanghai started to establish themselves as a major football team within China when they won their first league title. This was then quickly followed by their second league title in 1962, however in 1966 because of the Chinese Cultural Revolution, football in China was halted and Shanghai were unable to play. When football returned in China, Shanghai were able to return to the top tier, however they were unable to regain any of the dominance that they had previously shown and were even relegated in 1980. Though they were able to be quickly promoted in the following season, they spent many years without actually winning any titles until Wang Houjun led them to win the Chinese FA Cup in 1991, which was their first trophy in 29 years.

Professionalism
Throughout the 1990s, the Chinese Football Association were demanding more professionalism from their football teams and while many were semi-professional, Shanghai would be one of the first when they gathered sponsorship from Yu Zhifei and the local company named Shenhua ("Flower of Shanghai") on 10 December 1993, founding Shanghai Shenhua. 
This then saw Shanghai hire their first professional manager in Xu Genbao, who was the previous China national team manager in 1994. The move would quickly see Shanghai win the second professional football league title by the end of the 1995 league season.
When Xu left, Shanghai attempted to bring in several foreign coaches to add more experience to the team, however few achieved any success despite being close on several occasions, except for Muricy Ramalho's brief spell when the club won the 1998 Chinese FA Cup.
By the end of 2001, the Shenhua group ended their sponsorship of the club and were replaced with SVA and the Shanghai Media & Entertainment Group. The club changed its name to Shanghai Shenhua SVA SMEG Football Club. The team however remained unique as it still retains "Shenhua" in its name, whereas many other teams drop the name of their former sponsors completely.
On the pitch, the club would take over Shanghai 02, a youth football team set up by Xu Genbao while also bringing in a new manager in Wu Jingui, who built a new squad predominantly using many from the Shanghai 02 squad and despite struggling in his debut season, he was able to win the league title in 2003. Critics would dispute the legitimacy of the title win after it was discovered in 2011 that the referee Lu Jun was bribed by the head of the CFA's referee arrangements, Zhang Jianqiang, to be biased towards Shenhua in a vital match against Shanghai COSCO Sanlin in a game that Shenhua won 4–1. Lu Jun and Zhang Jianqiang were both officially charged with match-fixing, while Shenhua's general manager Lou Shifang was discovered to be the person who orchestrated the bribes. Initially despite this indiscretion, the club was spared any disciplinary action. The reason provided by the CFA at the time for the leniency was that they would be punishing the individuals who put the game in disrepute and not the club; because Lou Shifang was Shenhua's offending participant and had left the club several years before the allegations were confirmed, it would have been harsh to punish the club retrospectively. On 18 February 2013 The CFA would decide to change its mind on Shenhua and retrospectively decided to punish the club by revoking its 2003 league title, fining the club with 1 million Yuan and giving a 6-point deduction at the beginning of the 2013 Chinese Super League season after it was discovered that they also fixed another game against Shaanxi National Power en route to winning the 2003 league title.

Zhu Jun era
In 2007, the owner of inner-city rival of Shanghai United, Zhu Jun and his company The9 Limited bought a majority share of Shanghai Shenhua and began to merge Shanghai United into Shanghai Shenhua. His first act was to replace the previously successful existing head coach Wu Jingui with Shanghai United's Osvaldo Giménez. The appointment was to prove highly disruptive and Wu Jingui was quickly brought back as the head coach after only a few months, but was sacked on 9 September 2008. Jia Xiuquan took over his position on the same day. This was followed by the club adding to their backroom staff when on 1 January 2009 Shenhua made Chinese football history by becoming the first Chinese team to hire a foreign CEO and a technical director when on 1 January 2009, the club hired former manager Osvaldo Gimenez as their chief executive officer. One day later, former PSV Eindhoven technical director Stan Valckx joined Shenhua in the same position.

 After a disappointing 2011 season in the Chinese Super League, Zhu Jun decided to bring in a marquee player, so on 12 December 2011 it was confirmed that Chelsea striker Nicolas Anelka would be arriving in Shanghai in January 2012, while six days later it was announced that his compatriot Jean Tigana would be the head coach from the 2012 season. Tigana was fired after a string of poor results and was replaced by former Argentina national team coach Sergio Batista to lead the team. After a successful season playing for Chelsea and winning the 2011–12 UEFA Champions League, Ivorian striker Didier Drogba signed a two-and-a-half-year deal with Shenhua. This was soon followed by the signing of Colombian international footballer Giovanni Moreno from Argentinian club Racing Club. These signings were intended to boost the club's title challenge and see Zhu Jun's investment within the club reach 150 million Yuan, which he believed gave him a controlling stake of 70 per cent as promised by the other shareholders. When the other shareholders decided not to agree to this arrangement, Zhu Jun decided to pull his funding of the club, which resulted in the team finishing in a disappointing ninth place and both Anelka and Drogba leaving the club. The relationship between Zhu Jun and the other shareholders became even more fractious at the beginning of the 2013 league season when the Chinese FA issued the club with a six-point deduction for match-fixing ten years prior and a fine of one million Yuan. This would lead to a shareholder dispute between the other shareholders SVA, Shanghai Media Group, Shanghai Electric Group and Huangpu SASAC on who should pay for this fine, which saw a gap in the club finances that saw Rolando Schiavi, Patricio Toranzo and Giovanni Moreno refuse to play the 31 March 2013 league game against Liaoning Whowin because of unpaid wages.

Greenland
The Zhu Jun era ended on 31 January 2014 when the club was purchased by Greenland Holding Group Company Limited who bought a share of 28.5% of the club. On 6 February 2014, Greenland Holding Group Company Limited announced that the club's official name would be changed to "Shanghai Greenland FC, Shanghai Greenland Shenhua team" and it was hoped that by retaining Shenhua within the official team name it would appease the fans by reflecting on the club's heritage. This did not work. Subsequent badge alterations which eliminated Shenhua from the team's logo drew significant criticism from many of the club's supporters, who publicly voiced their dissatisfaction on 9 March 2014 during the league game against Shanghai Shenxin as they saw removing Shenhua from the club's name as a stain on the team's heritage and history. On 18 July 2014 the club bowed to pressure from their supporters when they officially released a new team badge, which brought Shenhua back into the team logo and subsequently changed the club's name to "Shanghai Greenland Shenhua Football Club".

On 3 February 2015, three days after the Australian national football team won the AFC Asian Cup, Tim Cahill announced he had been signed by the Shenhua, moving from the New York Red Bulls Despite signing a one-year contract extension in November 2015, Tim Cahill announced on his Instagram on 16 February 2016 that his contract had been terminated by incoming coach, Gregorio Manzano. No reason was given for his termination beyond saying that he was "not part of the new coach Manzano's plans for the 2016 season..."

Shanghai Shenhua won the 2019 Chinese FA Cup beating Shandong Luneng 3–0 at a packed Hongkou Stadium on 6 Dec 2019, making it a 3–1 aggregate victory for the Blues. It is the fifth time Shenhua have lifted the trophy, and the second time in three years, after their 2017 Chinese FA Cup victory over city rival Shanghai SIPG.

In 2021, the CFA launched its "neutral name campaign", requiring professional clubs to switch to names that do not mention their sponsors. The club, though always had been publicly recognized as "Shenhua", had different sponsor prefixes and suffixes (such as "Greenland Shenhua" and "Shenhua SVA") in the last thirty years. Responding to the call for neutral names, the club owner, Greenland, restored the name of the club to "Shanghai Shenhua F.C." without prefixes or suffixes on February 9, 2021.

On 23 November 2022 the club was deducted six points for unpaid salaries. The club would admit that they had been in financial difficulties for over a year and it was exasperated by the COVID-19 pandemic, however they have resolved the issue and were looking for additional financial investment. On 6 January 2023 the club declared that the Shanghai Jiushi Group would become the owners of the club.

Rivalries

Shenhua's fiercest and oldest rivalry is against Beijing Guoan and is often referred to as the China Derby. The rivalry with Beijing is viewed as a manifestation of the rivalry that exists between the two most important cities in the country, as one is the center of government while the other is the financial centre of modern commerce within China. Each club had an extensive history including successful periods. However, they rarely competed directly for trophies until the 1997 league season. With Shenhua having won the 1995 league title and Beijing having won the 1996 Chinese FA Cup both teams looked as if they had the pedigree to win trophies that season and on 20 July 1997 in a vital league game, Beijing thrashed Shenhua 9–1 at the Workers Stadium in Beijing. It would be Beijing's largest victory and Shenhua's greatest defeat ever recorded. Soon after that event both teams would meet again in the 1997 FA Cup final, which saw Beijing win the cup.

When professionalism was established in 1994 within the Chinese leagues it opened the door for more than one team within each city. This eventually paved the way for the first ever Chinese top-flight city derby, which took place in 2002 when Shanghai Shenhua lost 2–0 to Shanghai Zhongyuan (later renamed Inter) in front of a sold out Hongkou Football Stadium. Known as the Shanghai derby it would be the start of an intense but short rivalry between the two clubs, which reached its peak on the final day of the 2003 league season with both teams within reach of winning the league title. Shenhua won their game while Inter surprisingly lost theirs to relegation fighting club Tianjin Kangshifu. This saw critics dispute the title win and it was eventually discovered that both teams had players and officials match-fix games throughout the campaign. Shenhua would retrospectively lose their title while the Inter owners decided it was financially unviable to remain in Shanghai and relocated their team to Xi'an, which effectively ended the rivalry.

With Inter Shanghai leaving the city Shenhua experienced another one of these Shanghai derbies when Shanghai United were promoted in the 2006 league season. The rivalry between the two teams never reached the same intensity as what was experienced against Inter because United had only recently relocated to the city and were building their fan base. Any development of a rivalry was ultimately cut short when Zhu Jun took over both teams and merged them together with Shenhua keeping their name. In 2012 Shanghai Shenxin moved to the city revitalizing the derby, however it was the promotion of Shanghai SIPG in 2013 that caught to fans imagination because they were formed by Xu Genbao who had previously managed Shenhua. The club's geographical location has also opened them up to rivalries with neighbouring club's Hangzhou Greentown and Jiangsu Suning where they contest in a fixture called the Yangtze Delta Derby.

Later, with the relegation of Shanghai Shenxin in 2015 and then disbandment in 2020, Shanghai SIPG became the sole rival for Shenhua in Shanghai. The competition reached its peak when Shenhua beat SIPG in the 2017 Chinese FA Cup finals on aggregate and when SIPG won the super league soon after in 2018. The rivalry between the fans and the players made the new Shanghai derby arguably the most exciting derby in China. Also, in 2020, with Jiangsu Suning lifting the domestic league, Jiangsu fans escalated the cross-town rivalry by renting a billboard showcasing Jiangsu's trophy just outside the Hongkou Stadium, Shenhua's home venue. This act of provocation incited massive rebuke from the Shenhua fans, resulting in the ad being removed the day after. However, though fierce the rivalry might be through the years, it concluded with Jiangsu Suning's dissolution in 2021.

Players

First team squad

Reserve squad
Updated 1 March 2019

Unregistered players

Out on loan

Coaching staff

|}

Managerial history
Managers who have coached the club and team since Shanghai Shenhua became a professional club back in 1993.

Shenhua FC
  Xu Genbao (10 Dec 1993 – 31 Dec 1996)
  Yordan Ivanov Stoikov (1997)
  Andrzej Strejlau (1 July 1997 – 30 June 1998)
  Muricy Ramalho (1998)
  Sebastião Lazaroni (1999)
  Ljupko Petrović (2000)

Shenhua SVA SMEG
  Ilija Petković (2001)
  Xu Genbao (1 Dec 2001 – 23 July 2002)
  Wu Jingui (interim) (22 July 2002 – 31 Dec 2002)
  Wu Jingui (1 Jan 2003 – 31 Dec 2003)
  Mao Yijun (1 Jan 2004 – 1 March 2004)
  Howard Wilkinson (1 March 2004 – 30 May 2004)
  Jia Xiuquan (2004)
  Valeri Nepomniachi (2004–05)
  Wu Jingui (1 Jan 2006 – 31 Dec 2006)

Shenhua Liansheng
  Osvaldo Gimenez (2007)
  Wu Jingui (interim) (Sept 1, 2007–31 Dec 2007)
  Wu Jingui (1 Jan 2008 – Sept 3, 2008)
  Jia Xiuquan (Sept 1, 2008–1 Dec 2009)
  Miroslav Blažević (19 Dec 2009 – 9 Aug 2011)
  Xi Zhikang (1 Jan 2011 – 31 Dec 2011)
  Dražen Besek (10 Aug 2011 – 31 Dec 2011)
  Jean Tigana (1 Jan 2012 – 26 April 2012)
  Jean-Florent Ikwange Ibenge (interim) (26 April 2012 – 29 May 2012)
  Sergio Batista (30 May 2012 – 4 July 2013)
  Nicolas Anelka (Short Spell Player Coach) (April 2012)
  Shen Xiangfu (5 July 2013 – 29 March 2014)

Greenland Shenhua
  Sergio Batista (29 March 2014 – 30 Nov 2014)
  Francis Gillot (4 Dec 2014 – 29 Nov 2015)
  Gregorio Manzano (18 Dec 2015 – 9 Nov 2016)
  Gus Poyet (29 Nov 2016 – 11 Sep 2017)
  Wu Jingui (11 Sep 2017 – 24 Dec 2018)
  Quique Sánchez Flores (25 Dec 2018 – 3 Jul 2019)
  Choi Kang-hee (5 Jul 2019 – 7 Aug 2021)
  Mao Yijun (caretaker) (7 Aug 2021 – 1 Mar 2022 )
  Wu Jingui (1 Mar 2022 - )

Honours
All-time honours list including semi-professional Shanghai period.

First team
Domestic titles
 Chinese Jia-A League/Chinese Super League
Winners (3): 1961, 1962, 1995, 2003
 Chinese FA Cup
Winners (5): 1956, 1991, 1998, 2017, 2019
 Chinese FA Super Cup
Winners (3): 1995, 1998, 2001

International titles
 A3 Champions Cup
Winners (1): 2007
 Queen's Cup
Winners (1): 1986

Reserve team
 National Reserve League
Winners (1): 2004

Youth academy
 National Youth League U19
Winners (1): 2014
 National Youth League U17
Winners (1): 2018
 National Youth League Champions Cup U17
Winners (1): 2018

Results
All-time League Rankings

Updated 2022.

 No league games in 1959, 1966–72, 1975; Shanghai did not compete for position because they were hosts in 1965; 1974 only played in group stage before touring Africa.
: In the group stage. : In final group stage. : In the southern league. : Title revoked due to match-fixing : Deducted 6 points. : Shanghai Shenhua had 6 points deducted due to unpaid salaries on 23 November 2022.

Key
<div>

 Pld = Played
 W = Games won
 D = Games drawn
 L = Games lost
 F = Goals for
 A = Goals against
 Pts = Points
 Pos = Final position

 DNQ = Did not qualify
 DNE = Did not enter
 NH = Not Held
- = Does Not Exist
 R1 = Round 1
 R2 = Round 2
 R3 = Round 3
 R4 = Round 4

 SF = Semi-finals
 QF = Quarter-finals
 R16 = Round of 16
 Group = Group stage
 GS2 = Second Group stage
 QR1 = First Qualifying Round
 QR2 = Second Qualifying Round
 QR3 = Third Qualifying Round
 POR = Play-off Round

International results
Updated 12 March 2021

On neutral venue Shanghai Shenhua score is counted first.

Key
 (H) = Home
 (A) = Away
 (N) = Neutral

Professional club records
Record home victory: 8–1 v Liaoning Whowin (30 June 2017) 	
Record away victory: 6–2 v Shenyang Ginde (10 June 2001) 	 	
Record home defeat: 1–6 v Guangzhou Apollo (14 August 1994) 	 	
Record away defeat: 1–9 v Beijing Guoan (20 July 1997)

Notes

References

External links
Official website 
Stats on Sohu 
Stats on Sina 

 
Association football clubs established in 1993
Chinese Super League clubs
Football clubs in Shanghai
1993 establishments in China